Akan is a Central Tano language and the principal native language of the Akan people of Ghana,  spoken over much of the southern half of Ghana. About 80% of Ghana's population can speak Akan, and about 44% of Ghanaians are native speakers. It is also spoken in parts of Côte d'Ivoire.

Four dialects have been developed as literary standards with distinct orthographies: Asante, Akuapem, Bono (collectively known as Twi), and Fante; which, despite being mutually intelligible, were inaccessible in written form to speakers of the other standards until the Akan Orthography Committee (AOC)'s development of a common Akan orthography in 1978, based mainly on Akuapem Twi. This unified orthography is used as the medium of instruction in primary school by speakers of several other Central Tano languages, such as Akyem, Anyi, Sehwi, Fante, Ahanta, and the Guan languages. The Akan Orthography Committee has worked on the creation of a standard orthography.

With the Atlantic slave trade, the language was introduced to the Caribbean and South America, notably in Suriname, spoken by the Ndyuka, and in Jamaica, spoken by the Jamaican Maroons, also known as the Coromantee. The cultures of the descendants of escaped slaves in the interior of Suriname and the Maroons in Jamaica still retain influences from this language, including the Akan naming practice of naming children after the day of the week on which they are born, e.g. Akwasi/Kwasi for a boy or Akosua for a girl born on a Sunday. In Jamaica and Suriname, the Anansi spider stories are still well-known.

History 
In history, the Akans who live in Ghana migrated in successive waves between the 11th and 18th centuries. Others inhabit the eastern part of Ivory Coast and parts of Togo. They migrated from the north to occupy the forest and coastal areas in the south in the 13th century. The Akans have a strong oral history tradition of their past and they're also known in the art history world for symbolic artifacts of wood, metal and terracotta. Their cultural ideas are expressed in stories and proverbs and also in designs such as symbols used in carvings and on clothes. The cultural and historic nature of the Akans in Ghana makes it an area of research for various disciplines such as folklore, literary studies, linguistics, anthropology and history.

Relationship to other Central Tano languages
Akan is a dialect continuum that includes Twi, Fante, and Wasa. Ethnologue, whose classification is based on studies of mutual intelligibility and lexical similarity from a multitude of sources, classifies the varieties of Akan as dialects of the overarching Akan language, which belongs to the Central Tano language family. Glottolog makes basically the same analysis, with the exception that the Akan dialect continuum is labeled "Akanic".

According to work done by P. K. Agbedor, Fante, Twi (Bono, Asante and Akuapem), Sefwi, Wassa, Asen, Akwamu, and Kwahu belong to Cluster 1 of the speech forms of Ghana, defined as in Ethnologue by the level of mutual intelligibility. Cluster 1 may better be termed r-Akan, which do not have /l/ as a phoneme, while l-Akan refers to the Akan cluster comprising Nzema, Baoulé, Anyin and other dialects spoken mainly in the Ivory Coast, which have /l/ in place of /r/.

Phonology
The Akan dialects contain extensive palatalization, vowel harmony, and tone terracing.

Consonants
Before front vowels, all Asante consonants are palatalized (or labio-palatalized), and the stops are to some extent affricated. In the table below, palatalized allophones which involve more than minor phonetic palatalization are specified, in the context of the vowel .

In Asante,  followed by a vowel is pronounced , but in Akuapem it remains . The sequence  is pronounced .

A word final  can be heard as a glottal stop .

The transcriptions in the tables below are in the order /phonemic/, [phonetic]. Likewise, velar  may be transcribed . Orthographic  is palatalized .

Vowels
The Akan dialects have fourteen to fifteen vowels: four to five "tense" vowels (advanced tongue root, or +ATR), five "lax" vowels (retracted tongue root, or -ATR), which are adequately but not completely represented by the seven-vowel orthography, and five nasal vowels, which are not represented at all. All fourteen were distinguished in the Gold Coast alphabet of the colonial era. The two vowels written e ( and ) and o ( and ) are often not distinguished in pronunciation.

ATR harmony
Akan vowels engage in a form of vowel harmony with the root of the tongue.
 -ATR vowels followed by the +ATR non-mid vowels /i̘ a̘ u̘/ become +ATR. This is generally reflected in the orthography: That is, orthographic  become i e a o u. However, it is no longer reflected in the case of subject and possessive pronouns, giving them a consistent spelling. This rule takes precedence over the next one.
 After the -ATR non-high vowels /e a o/, +ATR mid vowels /e̘ o̘/ become -ATR high vowels /i u/. This is not reflected in the orthography, for both sets of vowels are spelled , and in many dialects this rule does not apply, for these vowels have merged.

Tones
Akan has three phonemic tones, high (/H/), mid (/M/), and low (/L/). Initial syllable may only be high or low.

Tone terracing
The phonetic pitch of the three tones depends on their environment, often being lowered after other tones, producing a steady decline known as tone terracing.

/H/ tones have the same pitch as a preceding /H/ or /M/ tone within the same tonic phrase, whereas /M/ tones have a lower pitch. That is, the sequences /HH/ and /MH/ have a level pitch, whereas the sequences /HM/ and /MM/ have a falling pitch. /H/ is lowered (downstepped) after a /L/.

/L/ is the default tone, which emerges in situations such as reduplicated prefixes. It is always at bottom of the speaker's pitch range, except in the sequence /HLH/, in which case it is raised in pitch but the final /H/ is still lowered. Thus /HMH/ and /HLH/ are pronounced with distinct but very similar pitches.

After the first "prominent" syllable of a clause, usually the first high tone, there is a downstep. This syllable is usually stressed.

Morphology

Formation of plural nouns in Akan

Akan forms some plural nouns by adding the prefixes 'm' or 'n' to the original word and removing the first sound of the noun. Example include nouns like abofra (child), which forms its plural by removing the 'ab' from the word and adding 'mm' to form its plural: mmofra (children). Same goes for aboa (animal) to mmoa (animals), abusua (family) to mmusua (families), abirekyie (goat) to mmirekyie (goats) etc. in the Twi dialect.

The nouns which use the 'n' prefix include; adaka (box) to nnaka (boxes), adanko (rabbit) to nnanko (rabbits), aduro (medicine) to nnuro (medicines), atare (dress) to ntare (dresses), odwan (sheep) to nnwan (sheep plural), aduane (food) to nnuane (food plural), kraman (dog) to nkraman (dogs), kanea (light) to nkanea (lights), safoa (key) to nsafoa (keys).

Akan can create plural nouns by adding the suffix nom to the original word. Examples include; agya (father) to agyanom (fathers), nana (grandparent/grandchild) to nananom (grandparents/grandchildren), nua (sibling) to nuanom (siblings), yere (wife) to yerenom (wives).

Some Akan nouns are the same in both singular and plural. Nouns such as nkyene (salt), ani (eye), sika (money) e.t.c are written the same in both singular and plural.

Literature 

The Akan language has a rich literature in proverbs, folktales, and traditional drama, as well as a new literature in dramas, short stories, and novels. This literature began to be documented in written form in the late 1800s. Later, Joseph Hanson Kwabena Nketia collected a number of proverbs and folktales, including Funeral Dirges of the Akan People (1969), Folk Songs of Ghana (1963), and Akan Poetry (1958). Some of the important authors in the language are A. A. Opoku (dramatist), E. J. Osew (dramatist), K. E. Owusu (novelist), and R. A. Tabi (dramatist and novelist). The Bureau of Ghana Languages has been unable to continue printing novels in the language, and the following are out of print: Obreguo, Okrabiri, Afrakoma, Obeede, Fia Tsatsala, and Ku Di Fo Nanawu.

Education

Primary 
In 1978 the AOC established a common orthography for all of Akan, which is used as the medium of instruction in primary school. The Akan language is recognized for literacy, from at least the lower primary level (primary 1–3).

University 
The Akan language is studied at several major universities in the United States, including Ohio University, Ohio State University, University of Wisconsin-Madison, Harvard University, Boston University, Indiana University, University of Michigan, and The University of Florida. Akan has been a regular African language of study in the annual Summer Cooperative African Languages Institute (SCALI) program. The Akan language is studied in these universities as a bachelor or masters program.

Common phrases 

Akwaaba – Welcome
Aane (Twi) - Yes
Nyew (Fante)– Yes
Yiw (Akuapem) – Yes
Yoo  – Okay/Alright
Oho / anhã (Fante)/Daabi (Twi)– No/Nope
Da yie (Twi) – Good night (literally "sleep well")
Me rekɔ da(Fante) – I'm going to sleep
Ɛte sɛn? (Twi) – How is it going/How are you? (could also be used in the non lit. sense as "hello")
Medaase – Thank you
Mepa wo kyɛw – Please/excuse me/I beg your pardon
Ndwom (Fante)/nnwom (Twi) – Song/songs or music
Wo din de sɛn?/Yɛfrɛ wo sɛn? (Twi) - What is your name?
Wo dzin dze dεn? (Fante) – What is your name?
Me dzin dze.../Wɔfrɛ me... (Fante) – My name is/I'm called...
Woedzi mfe ahen? (Fante) – How old is he/she?
Edzi mfe ahen (Fante) – How old are you?
ɔwɔ hen? – Where is it?
Me rekɔ – I am going/ I am taking my leave.
Mbo (Fante)/Mmo (Twi)– Good
Jo (Fante)/Kɔ (Twi) – Leave
Ayɛ Adze (Fante) – well done
Gyae – Stop
Da – Sleep
Bra - Come
Bra ha - Come here
Bɛ didi - Come and eat

Names of Places 

 Fie - Home
 Sukuu - School
 Asɔre - Church
 Dwaaso - Market
 sukuupon - University or a tertiary Institution
 Ayaresabea - Hospital

References

Bibliography
 Kasahorow Editors (2005), Modern Akan: A concise introduction to the Akuapem, Fanti and Twi language. kasahorow, Accra. 
 Dolphyne, Florence Abena (1988), The Akan (Twi-Fante) Language: Its Sound Systems and Tonal Structure. Ghana Universities Press, Accra. 
 F.A. Dolphyne (1996) A Comprehensive Course in Twi (Asante) for the Non-Twi Learner. Ghana University Press, Accra. .
 Schacter, Paul (1968). A Phonology of Akan: Akuapem, Asante, Fante. Los Angeles: UC Press.
 William Nketia (2004) Twi für Ghana:; Wort für Wort. Reise Know-How Verlag, Bielefeld. . (In German)
 Obeng, Samuel Gyasi. (2001). African anthroponymy: An ethnopragmatic and norphophonological study of personal names in Akan and some African societies. LINCOM studies in anthropology 08. Muenchen: LINCOM Europa. .
 J.E. Redden and N. Owusu (1963, 1995). Twi Basic Course. Foreign Service Institute (Hippocrene reprint).

External links

 English-Tshi (Asante) : a dictionary = Enyiresi-Twi nsem-asekyere-nhõma (1909), Evangelische Missionsgesellschaft in Basel
 Akan Language Resources
 Journal of West African Languages: Akan
 My First Akan Dictionary Online Akan (Twi, Fanti) Dictionary
 Twi Word of the Day and Articles
 Twi Language Resources
 The Bible in Twi
 The Quran in Twi Language
 Poem translated into Twi
 Watch Twi Music Videos
 Prayer in Twi used by Ghanaians of the Baha'i Faith
 Open Twi Project, a project to bring Akan (Asante Twi at the moment) to standard e.g. in software, dictionary, and grammar
Literature and articles in Ahanta Literature and articles in Ahanta.

 
Central Tano languages
Languages of Ghana
Akan people